The 1981 Moroccan riots (also referred to as  The Bread Martyrs), also known as the Casablanca bread riots, broke out on May 29, 1981, in Casablanca, Morocco—a major event in the Years of Lead under Hassan II of Morocco. The revolt was driven by price increases in basic food supplies. This intifada was the first of two IMF riots in Morocco—dubbed the "Hunger Revolts" by the international press—the second taking place in 1984 primarily in northern cities such as Nador, Al Hoceima, Tetouan, and Ksar el-Kebir.

Context 
Morocco was economically strained from six years in the Western Sahara War. The cost of basic foods soared, with the prices of flour up 40%, sugar 50%, oil 28%, milk 14%, and butter 76%. A general strike was organized in response.

Events 
Thousands of young people from the impoverished shanty towns surrounding Casablanca formed large mobs and proceeded to destroy symbols of wealth in the city, including buses, banks, pharmacies, grocery stores, and expensive cars. Police and military units fired into the crowds. The government's official death toll was 66, while the opposition reported a much higher number of 637. Most of the fatalities were youths from the slums shot to death.

References 

Protests in Morocco
Hassan II of Morocco
1981 protests
1981 riots
1981 in Morocco
Riots and civil disorder in Morocco
20th century in Casablanca
Food riots